DVDs of the television show Angel  were produced by 20th Century Fox Home Entertainment and released beginning in 2001. These sets contained not only the episodes, but extra features, such as: audio commentaries by the shows makers, documentary features, blooper reels, shooting scripts and so on.

Release dates

Differences between versions

The Angel DVD sets were released in at least three encoding formats:

 Region 1 (United States and Canada), in NTSC format
 Region 2 (United Kingdom and Europe), in PAL format
 Region 4 (Australia and New Zealand), in PAL format

Unlike the Buffy the Vampire Slayer DVDs, the choice of widescreen versus standard screen does not vary by region. In all regions, season one of Angel is presented in the standard format (4:3), and seasons two through five are presented in widescreen (16:9). This matches the way the show itself was broadcast from seasons 3-5, although in the U.S. season 2 was presented as standard format but was changed to widescreen for the DVD. This change did lead to some issues on the season 2 DVD release, such as instances where objects that would have remained outside of the broadcast image on the standard format become apparent, creating evident mistakes (e.g. Angel's usually-invisible reflection being visible in the extremities of a number of shots in the first episode).

Aside from the region encoding (and the packaging), the Region 2 and Region 4 DVDs are identical.  However, there are several content differences between the Region 1 DVDs and the Region 2 and 4 DVDs.

Scenes from previous episodes 

The Region 2 and 4 DVDs (except Season 1) include the scenes from previous episodes ("Previously on Angel") at the beginning of each episode; the Region 1 DVDs do not, except in Season 5.

Subtitles 

In the Region 2 and 4 releases, episodes with commentaries include two English subtitles: the show itself, and the commentary. The Region 1 releases do not offer subtitles for the commentaries.

The Region 1 DVDs also offer a smaller choice of non-English languages subtitles than the Region 2 and 4 DVDs.

Season 1

Disc 1
Episodes
 Episode 1: "City of"
 Episode 2: "Lonely Hearts"
 Episode 3: "In the Dark"
 Episode 4: "I Fall to Pieces"

Special features
 Commentary on "City of" by co-writer/director Joss Whedon and co-writer David Greenwalt

Disc 2
Episodes
 Episode 5: "Rm w/a Vu"
 Episode 6: "Sense & Sensitivity"
 Episode 7: "Bachelor Party"
 Episode 8: "I Will Remember You"

Special features
 Commentary on "Rm w/a Vu" by writer Jane Espenson

Disc 3
Episodes
 Episode 9: "Hero"
 Episode 10: "Parting Gifts"
 Episode 11: "Somnambulist"

Special features
 Featurette: "Season 1"
 Cast Bios
 Still Gallery

Disc 4
Episodes
 Episode 12: "Expecting"
 Episode 13: "She"
 Episode 14: "I've Got You Under My Skin"
 Episode 15: "The Prodigal"

Disc 5
Episodes
 Episode 16: "The Ring"
 Episode 17: "Eternity"
 Episode 18: "Five by Five"
 Episode 19: "Sanctuary"

Special features
  Script for "Five by Five" and "Sanctuary"

Disc 6
Episodes
 Episode 20: "War Zone"
 Episode 21: "Blind Date"
 Episode 22: "To Shanshu in L.A."

Special features
  Featurette: "I'm Cordelia"
  Featurette: "Introducing Angel"
  Featurette: "The Demons"

Season 2

Disc 1
Episodes
 Episode 1: "Judgment"
 Episode 2: "Are You Now or Have You Ever Been"
 Episode 3: "First Impressions"
 Episode 4: "Untouched"

Special features
 Commentary on "Are You Now or Have You Ever Been" by writer Tim Minear

Disc 2
Episodes
 Episode 5: "Dear Boy"
 Episode 6: "Guise Will Be Guise"
 Episode 7: "Darla"
 Episode 8: "The Shroud of Rahmon"

Special features
 Script for "Darla"

Disc 3
Episodes
 Episode 9: "The Trial"
 Episode 10: "Reunion"
 Episode 11: "Redefinition"

Special features
 Featurette: "Making up the Monsters"
 Featurette: "Inside the Agency"
 Still Gallery
 Blue Prints

Disc 4
Episodes
 Episode 12: "Blood Money"
 Episode 13: "Happy Anniversary"
 Episode 14: "The Thin Dead Line"
 Episode 15: "Reprise"

Disc 5
Episodes
 Episode 16: "Epiphany"
 Episode 17: "Disharmony"
 Episode 18: "Dead End"
 Episode 19: "Belonging"

Special features
 Script for "Disharmony"

Disc 6
Episodes
 Episode 20: "Over the Rainbow"
 Episode 21: "Through the Looking Glass"
 Episode 22: "There's No Place Like Plrtz Glrb"

Special features
 Commentary on "Over the Rainbow" by director Fred Keller
 Featurette: "Stunts"
 Featurette: "Season 2 Overview"

Season 3

Disc 1
Episodes
 Episode 1: "Heartthrob"
 Episode 2: "That Vision Thing"
 Episode 3: "That Old Gang of Mine"
 Episode 4: "Carpe Noctem"

Disc 2
Episodes
 Episode 5: "Fredless"
 Episode 6: "Billy"
 Episode 7: "Offspring"
 Episode 8: "Quickening"

Special features
 Commentary on "Billy" by writers Tim Minear and Jeffrey Bell

Disc 3
Episodes
 Episode 9: "Lullaby"
 Episode 10: "Dad"
 Episode 11: "Birthday"

Special features
 Commentary on "Lullaby" by writer/director Tim Minear and Mere Smith
 Deleted scenes from "Birthday" with commentary by Tim Minear and Mere Smith
 Featurette: "Darla: Deliver Us From Evil"
 Angel Series Outtakes

Disc 4
Episodes
 Episode 12: "Provider"
 Episode 13: "Waiting in the Wings"
 Episode 14: "Couplet"
 Episode 15: "Loyalty"

Special features
 Commentary on "Waiting in the Wings" writer/director by Joss Whedon
 Deleted scenes from "Waiting in the Wings" with commentary by Joss Whedon

Disc 5
Episodes
 Episode 16: "Sleep Tight"
 Episode 17: "Forgiving"
 Episode 18: "Double or Nothing"
 Episode 19: "The Price"

Disc 6
Episodes
 Episode 20: "A New World"
 Episode 21: "Benediction"
 Episode 22: "Tomorrow"

Special features
 Featurette: "Season 3 Overview"
 Featurette: "Page to Screen"
 Screen Tests: Amy Acker and Vincent Kartheiser
 Still Gallery

Season 4

Disc 1
Episodes
 Episode 1: "Deep Down"
 Episode 2: "Ground State"
 Episode 3: "The House Always Wins"
 Episode 4: "Slouching Toward Bethlehem"

Special features
 Commentary on "The House Always Wins" by writer David Fury and actor Andy Hallett

Disc 2
Episodes
 Episode 5: "Supersymmetry"
 Episode 6: "Spin the Bottle"
 Episode 7: "Apocalypse, Nowish"
 Episode 8: "Habeas Corpses"

Special features
 Commentary on "Spin the Bottle" by writer/director Joss Whedon and actor Alexis Denisof
 Commentary on "Apocalypse, Nowish" by director Vern Gillum and writer Steven S. DeKnight
 Featurette: "Angel and the Apocalypse"

Disc 3
Episodes
 Episode 9: "Long Day's Journey"
 Episode 10: "Awakening"
 Episode 11: "Soulless"

Disc 4
Episodes
 Episode 12: "Calvary"
 Episode 13: "Salvage"
 Episode 14: "Release"
 Episode 15: "Orpheus"

Special features
 Commentary on "Orpheus" by director Terrence O'Hara and co-executive producer Jeffrey Bell

Disc 5
Episodes
 Episode 16: "Players"
 Episode 17: "Inside Out"
 Episode 18: "Shiny Happy People"
 Episode 19: "The Magic Bullet"

Special features
 Commentary on "Inside Out" by writer/director Steven S. DeKnight
 Commentary on "The Magic Bullet" by writer/director Jeffrey Bell

Disc 6
Episodes
 Episode 20: "Sacrifice"
 Episode 21: "Peace Out"
 Episode 22: "Home"

Special features
 Commentary for "Home" by writer/director Tim Minear
 Featurette: "Prophesies: Season Four Overview"
 Unplugged: Season Four Outtakes"
 Featurette: "Last Looks: The Hyperion Hotel"
 Featurette: "Fatal Beauty and the Beast"
 Featurette: "Malice In Wonderland: Wolfram & Hart"

Season 5

Disc 1
Episodes
 Episode 1: "Conviction"
 Episode 2: "Just Rewards"
 Episode 3: "Unleashed"
 Episode 4: "Hell Bound"

Special features
 Commentary on "Conviction" by writer/director Joss Whedon
 "Hey Kids! It's Smile Time" featurette

Disc 2
Episodes
 Episode 5: "Life of the Party"
 Episode 6: "The Cautionary Tale of Numero Cinco"
 Episode 7: "Lineage"
 Episode 8: "Destiny"

Special features
  Commentary on "Destiny" by director Skip Schoolnik, writers David Fury and Steven S. Deknight, and actress Juliet Landau

Disc 3
Episodes
 Episode 9: "Harm's Way"
 Episode 10: "Soul Purpose"
 Episode 11: "Damage"

Special features
 Commentary on "Soul Purpose" by actor/director David Boreanaz, writer Brent Fletcher, and actor Christian Kane

Disc 4
Episodes
 Episode 12: "You're Welcome"
 Episode 13: "Why We Fight"
 Episode 14: "Smile Time"
 Episode 15: "A Hole in the World"

Special features
 Commentary on "You're Welcome" by writer/director David Fury, and actors Christian Kane and Sarah Thompson
 Commentary on "A Hole in the World" by writer/director Joss Whedon, and actors Amy Acker and Alexis Denisof
 "Angel 100" featurette

Disc 5
Episodes
 Episode 16: "Shells"
 Episode 17: "Underneath"
 Episode 18: "Origin"
 Episode 19: "Time Bomb"

Special features
  Commentary on "Underneath" by director Skip Schoolnik, writers Elizabeth Craft and Sarah Fain, and actor Adam Baldwin
 "Angel: Choreography of a Stunt" featurette

Disc 6
Episodes
 Episode 20: "The Girl in Question"
 Episode 21: "Power Play"
 Episode 22: "Not Fade Away"

Special features
 Commentary on "Not Fade Away" by co-writer/director Jeffrey Bell
 Featurette: "Angel: The Final Season"
 Featurette: "To Live & Die in L.A.: The Best of Angel"
 Featurette: "Halos & Horns: Recurring Villainy"
 Featurette: "Angel Unbound: The Gag Reels"

Collections

The complete series box set of Angel (seasons 1-5) was released in the UK on October 30, 2006. They have also been released in Australia, in 4 episode, half season, full season, and complete series box sets.

The Angel season box sets were also re-released in the UK at a lower price point and in cheaper plastic boxes. Seasons 1 and 2 were released on October 3, 2005; seasons 3 and 4 on March 6, 2006; and season 5 on May 8, 2006.

In Australia, Region 4, the first releases were released with each season as Part 1 and Part 2 'Collector's Edition' box sets where each part had 3 discs each, 3 Amaray Cases in a slip box. Season 1, Parts 1 & 2 were released on December 3, 2001. Season 2, Parts 1 & 2 on April 9, 2002. Season 3, Parts 1 & 2 on 18 March 2003. Season 4 Parts 1 & 2 on April 27, 2004. Season 5, Parts 1 & 2 on February 22, 2005. These releases were then later re-issued in Slimline sets so that each part was in a single plastic case, these were also 'Collector's Edition'. The first 'Complete Season' collections were in Amaray Fatpacks, released around September, 2005, which, and later reissued in slimline cases in 2006. The 'Complete Collection' boxset has been released several times, the first being a cardboard box released in 2006, the second was a collector's tin with 5 slimline cases on November 19, 2008. The third being a slip box with 2 fatbox cases titled 'The Complete Series' released on November 22, 2013, and the last version to date was in 2017, a slip box with 5 slimline cases.

The Region 1 Angel Collector's Set was released on October 30, 2007, with a newly packaged re-release following on October 12, 2010.

As with the Buffy the Vampire Slayer Region 2 character-based releases, several Angel DVDs, based around individual characters have been released, under the banner "The Vampire Anthology." This collection includes DVDs themed around Cordelia, Wesley, Gunn and Fred.

See also 
 List of Buffy the Vampire Slayer home video releases

References
 The DVD sets themselves

Release dates
 Buffy DVD and VHS - Bbc.co.uk (2004). Reveals UK release dates.
 Angel Season 5 - Amazon (2005)
 DVD details for Angel - Imdb (2006)

Specific references

Home video releases
Angel